Ernst Fischer may refer to:

 Ernst Fischer (composer) (1900–1975), German composer and keyboard player
 Ernst Fischer (weightlifter) (born 1904), Swiss Olympic weightlifter
 Ernst Fischer (writer) (1899–1972), Austrian journalist, writer and politician
 Ernst Fischer (journalist) (1942–2016), German journalist
 Ernst Otto Fischer (1918–2007), German chemist, Nobel prize winner
 Ernst Gottfried Fischer (1754–1831), German chemist developer of stoichiometry theory together with Jeremias Richter
 Kuno Fischer (Ernst Kuno Berthold Fischer, 1824–1907), German philosopher
 Ernst Sigismund Fischer (1875–1954), Austrian mathematician
 Ernst Peter Fischer (born 1947), German historian of science, and science publicist

See also
 Fischer